Airport Road, Kozhikode is an important road in Kozhikode, India. It extends from Thondayad Junction to Calicut Airport, about 20 km away. The road passes through Palazhi, Pantheeramkavu, Ramanattukara and Kondotty Thurakkal before reaching the airport.

History
100 years ago, the beach area was the centre of the city of Kozhikode. In the 1970s, the downtown shifted to the Mananchira area, and in the 1980s, Mavoor Road became the centre of activity. In the 2010s, the Thondayad Bypass area and the suburb of Palazhi on the Airport road have emerged as the new city centres with a vibrant night life.

Thondayad 

Thondayad Junction is an important intersection in Kozhikode. This junction connects the city to the eastern towns of Kozhikode District so the traffic is heavy. The junction also connects to the northern and southern cities of Kerala by express roads. Thondayad Junction is accessed from Mavoor Road on the western side.

Major landmarks in Thondayad
 Vigilance and Anti-corruption office
 Narakath Bhagavathy Temple
Kerala Kaumudi Newspaper
Chinmaya Vidyalaya
 Azhthya Kovil Maha Vishnu Goshala Temple

Palazhi Junction
Palazhi is a suburb of Kozhikode. It has risen to prominence recently because of the creation of a township called Hilite Mall. Palazhi is four kilometres from Thondayad Junction. Metro International Cardiac Center and the Cradle Maternity Hospital are situated in Palazhi.

Palazhi was originally a village with waterlogged streets during monsoons, creating problems for the residents. Recently the area has been highly commercialized because of the proximity to the highway and the eastern part of the city. The creation of Hilite Township and Hilite Mall has increased traffic issues in and around Palazhi.

Major landmarks in Palazhy 

Cyberpark Kozhikode
 Uralungal Cyberpark
 Mananthala Thazham Masjidh
 Metro International Cardiac Center
 Cradle Maternity Hospital
 Landmark World
 Koodathum Para Colony
 Mampuzha Bridge

Methott Thazham
Methott Thazham is a small village on the western side of Palazhi. It is famous for the Bhayankavu Temple and the Ollur Shiva Temple. The suburbs of Vazhipokku, Manathal Thazham, Poomangalam, Mecheri Thazham, Kaithaparampu, Kattukulangara, and Kommeri are near Methott Thazham. Methott Thazham is directly connected by a main road to the Kottooli and Pottammal junctions.

Hilite Township
Hilite township is a residential and commercial facility located at Palazhi junction. Hilite Mall is the most spacious shopping mall of north Kerala with 1,400,000 sq feet of shopping space. It is part of the Hilite City (11.256873°N 75.821287°E), an integrated township project.

Pantheeramkavu Junction
Pantheeramkavu or Pantheerankavu is a small town near Kozhikode city in India. The name translates to "the place with twelve temples". Today Pantheeramkavu is a fast-growing town with a population of 45,495. Pantheeramkavu has a literacy rate of 84%, higher than the national average of 59.5%. Male literacy is 86%, and female literacy is 82%. 11% of the population is under 6 years of age.

The road towards the east of Pantheerankavu connects the villages of Perumanna, Puthoor Madam, Mundupalam, Punathil Bazar and Payyadi Meethal. At the end of the road is the suburb of Palazhi. This locality is the home of the sprawling Hilite Mall and the township attached to it.

Regions of Pantheeramkavu 

Manikkadavu
 Nambi Kulam
 Kodal Nadakkavu
 Palazhi
 Iringallur
 Azhinjilam

Landmarks in Pantheeramkavu 

 Murukanad Subramanya Temple, Kodalnadakkavu
 Kailamadom School, Perumanna Road

Ramanattukara
Ramanattukara is the biggest town between Kozhikode and the airport. There are two busy road junctions in Ramanattukara. The first goes to the airport on the left side. The second, Nisari Junction, goes to the University of Calicut. The town is growing very fast due to the construction of many shopping malls and of Kadavu Resort, a 5-star hotel 2.5 kilometers from Ramanattukara. Ramanattukara acts as a major town in land routes between Calicut and towns such as Thrissur, Trivandrum, Manjeri and Coimbatore.

Tourist Attractions near Ramanattukara 

Kadalundi Bird Sanctuary, 9 km
 Chaliyam beach, 9 km
 Beypore Port, 9 km
 Homeo Road to Kuttoolangady, 1 km
 Commonwealth Tile Factory, 2 km

Major Organizations near Ramanattukara 

University of Calicut, 7 km
Farook College,  3 km
Alfarook College, 3 km
 Kinfra Industrial Park, 5 km

References

Suburbs of Kozhikode